Delio Rossi (born 26 January 1960) is an Italian football manager and former footballer who played as a midfielder. He was most recently in charge as head coach of Serie B club Ascoli.

Playing career
Rossi was born in Rimini. His playing career was not a bright one, as he reached his personal top from 1981 to 1983, playing in the Serie B with U.S. Foggia, where he spent most of his footballing time. He retired in 1989, after a season played with Fidelis Andria of Serie C2.

Managerial career

Early years and Serie A debut with Salernitana
Rossi, a sports science graduate with honours, took his first coaching job in 1990, aged 29, at Torremaggiore, of Promozione league, immediately winning the championship. The next year he joined Foggia as youth coach. In 1993, Rossi signed for Salernitana of Serie C1, and led the team to a Serie B promotion. After an unlucky comeback to Foggia, and a sixth place in Pescara, Rossi returned to coach Salernitana in 1997, leading the team to its second Serie A promotion in history. Rossi guided the team in Serie A too, but was fired in March 1999, as he was unable to lead Salernitana out of the relegation positions.

Minor teams in Serie A and Serie B
A troubled year in Genoa and a poor comeback to Pescara were followed by three seasons with Lecce. Rossi, appointed as Lecce's coach in February 2002, was not able to avoid relegation to Serie B, but led the team back to Serie A just the next season, and maintained a place in the division the next year. He left Lecce in 2004 to be replaced by his maestro Zděnek Zeman, who was head coach at Foggia during Rossi's times in leading its youth team.

In December 2004, Rossi replaced Andrea Mandorlini at the helm of Atalanta B.C., last-placed in Serie A. Despite all his efforts and numerous praises, Rossi was not able to let his team escape from relegation.

Lazio
Despite not saving Atalanta, his good efforts at the helm of the Dea club gained interest from Lazio, who appointed him as replacement for Giuseppe Papadopulo.

His time at Lazio has been a remarkable success for which he has aroused interest from many top Serie A clubs. Rossi guided Lazio to a surprising UEFA Cup place in the 2005–2006 season, only for the place to be lost as part of the Calciopoli scandal that rocked the country in the summer of 2006. Even more remarkable, however, was Rossi's feat the following season. Despite an initial 11-point points deduction (which was subsequently reduced to 3 on appeal), Rossi guided the biancocelesti to an unlikely third place Serie A finish and a place in the 2007–08 UEFA Champions League. However, during the 2007–08 season, he led Lazio to a disappointing 12th-place finish.

On 13 May 2009, Rossi led Lazio to their first trophy since the Coppa Italia triumph in 2004. It was also a Coppa Italia victory, which came after a successful penalty shootout against Sampdoria. On 8 June 2009, Delio Rossi was announced to have left Lazio because of personal reasons allegedly linked to an unstable working relationship with chairman Claudio Lotito. He was replaced by Davide Ballardini.

Palermo
On 23 November 2009, Rossi returned into management as new head coach of Palermo, replacing Walter Zenga at the helm of the rosanero. He immediately managed to turn the fortunes of Palermo, guiding the Sicilians to quickly rise up the Serie A league table also thanks to surprise results such as two 2–0 away win against teams such as AC Milan and Juventus, and ending the season in fifth place with only one point behind fourth-placed Sampdoria who were admitted to the UEFA Champions League third qualifying round at the rosanero's expense. He was consequently confirmed as head coach of Palermo for the 2010–11 season, during which he also guided the club in its 2010–11 UEFA Europa League campaign. Impressive results in the new season included another impressive win at Juventus' home, as well as his abilities in launching youngsters as Javier Pastore, Ezequiel Muñoz, Josip Iličić and Armin Bačinović.

Rossi was sacked on 28 February 2011 by club president Maurizio Zamparini following a record 0–7 home loss to Udinese; he was replaced by Serse Cosmi. However, Rossi returned at Palermo only four weeks later, after Cosmi's Palermo side was soundly defeated by Catania in the Sicilian derby later on 3 April. Following a surprising comeback, he led the club to the Coppa Italia final which the 3–1 defeat by Internazionale. During the pre-season, on 1 June 2011, Rossi resigned as Palermo manager by mutual consent with president Zamparini.

Fiorentina
On 7 November 2011, Rossi returned into management as new head coach of Serie A club Fiorentina, replacing Siniša Mihajlović, dismissed because of poor results. Rossi's debut match as Fiorentina boss ended in a 0–0 home draw against incumbent champions Milan. Afterwards, Fiorentina lost 2–0 to Delio's former club Palermo. He later beat Empoli 2–1 in the Coppa Italia. In the following weeks, he put Fiorentina up to 10th place in Seria A after they beat Roma 3–0. The following games however saw Fiorentina dropping into the table down to 17th place at some point, and thus involved in the fight to escape relegation.

Rossi's time with Fiorentina ended in shocking fashion. On 2 May 2012, during a home game against 19th-placed Novara, Rossi decided to substitute Serbian striker Adem Ljajić in the 32nd minute with Fiorentina losing 0–2. The player sarcastically applauded the substitution as he left the pitch and further gave the coach a sarcastic thumbs up from the dugout, to which Rossi reacted by physically assaulting Ljajić, pushing the youngster from above, then jumping after him into the dugout while attempting to punch him.
After the game (ended in a 2–2 draw), the club board announced to have immediately removed Rossi from his position due to his actions, with two games still to go in the league season. The incident also cost him a three-month ban from Italian football, effective from 3 May 2012.

Sampdoria
Rossi was appointed head coach of Sampdoria in December 2012 to replace Ciro Ferrara, becoming the seventh coach to work with both Genoa and Sampdoria. During his coaching tenure with the club, Rossi helped the Blucerchiati avoid relegation at the end of the 2012–13 Serie A season. On 11 November 2013, Rossi was sacked from his post, with Sampdoria in 18th position in the Serie A table having earned just 9 points and won only twice in 12 Serie A matches during the 2013–14 Serie A season.
Sampdoria had lost its last three Serie A matches, including a 2–1 defeat at Fiorentina on the day of Rossi's dismissal. Rossi hinted after the Fiorentina defeat that 'trust' between himself and the club was becoming an issue. "If there is a time where you do not feel that the trust is there, you should not wait to see how things unfold. I am a man of the world and I think that if the confidence is there, then it is normal that one continues, but if it is not, then it is better to end the rapport regardless of the results", he said.

Bologna
On 4 May 2015, Rossi was named the new manager of Bologna in Serie B replacing Diego López. He guided Bologna to win the promotion playoffs, defeating Pescara in the finals, and was confirmed for the club's successive Serie A campaign.

He was sacked by Bologna on 28 October 2015 after a string of negative results.

Levski
On 4 August 2017, Rossi was announced as the new head coach of Bulgarian club Levski Sofia. He was presented at a press conference a few days later, on 8 August 2017. After a string of 6 matches without victory, losing the final of the Bulgarian Cup and also a shock exit from Europa League at the hands of FC Vaduz, Rossi was released from his duties on 25 July 2018.

Return to Palermo
On 24 April 2019, he was appointed Palermo manager for his second time. After failing to win automatic promotion to Lecce in his four games in charge, Palermo was subsequently excluded from the subsequent promotion playoffs due to financial irregularities, and he was later not confirmed by the new ownership.

Ascoli
On 29 November 2020 he was named new head coach of Serie B club Ascoli. He was however sacked only less than a month later, on 22 December, after having achieved only one point in six games in charge.

Managerial statistics

Honours

Manager
Lazio
Coppa Italia: 2008–09

Palermo
Coppa Italia: 2010–11 runners-up

Levski Sofia
Bulgarian Cup: 2017–18 runners-up

References

1960 births
Living people
Calcio Foggia 1920 players
S.S. Fidelis Andria 1928 players
S.S. Lazio managers
Atalanta B.C. managers
U.S. Lecce managers
Delfino Pescara 1936 managers
Calcio Foggia 1920 managers
Genoa C.F.C. managers
Serie A managers
Serie B managers
Palermo F.C. managers
Italian footballers
Italian football managers
Sportspeople from Rimini
U.S. Salernitana 1919 managers
ACF Fiorentina managers
U.C. Sampdoria managers
Serie B players
Vis Pesaro dal 1898 players
Bologna F.C. 1909 managers
PFC Levski Sofia managers
Ascoli Calcio 1898 F.C. managers
Association football midfielders
Expatriate football managers in Bulgaria
Italian expatriate football managers
Footballers from Emilia-Romagna
Italian expatriate sportspeople in Bulgaria